Sherpur Government College, a college in the Sherpur District. It was established in 1964. It is situated at Bugraksha in Sherpur Sadar Upazila.

References

Colleges in Sherpur District
Educational institutions established in 1964
1964 establishments in East Pakistan